Erythranthe breweri is a species of monkeyflower known by the common name Brewer's monkeyflower. It is native to western North America from British Columbia to California to Colorado, where it grows in moist spots in several habitat types. This is a hairy annual herb producing a thin, erect stem up to 21 centimeters tall. The herbage is reddish green in color. The paired opposite leaves are linear in shape and up to 3.5 centimeters long. The plant bears small tubular flowers, each with its base encapsulated in a lightly hairy calyx of sepals with tiny equal lobes at its mouth. The five-lobed flower corolla is just a few millimeters long and light purplish pink in color, often with darker spots in the throat. It was formerly known as Mimulus breweri.

References

External links
Jepson Manual Treatment
USDA Plants Profile
Photo gallery

breweri
Flora of the Northwestern United States
Flora of Western Canada
Flora of California
Flora of Oregon
Flora of the Cascade Range
Flora of the Klamath Mountains
Flora of the Sierra Nevada (United States)
Natural history of the California Coast Ranges
Flora without expected TNC conservation status